Ana Karić (13 May 1941 – 9 October 2014) was a Croatian actress. She started acting in the early 1960s even before graduating from the Zagreb Academy of Dramatic Art in 1963. Although primarily a television actress, she also appeared in numerous film and theatre productions.

Karić starred in a number of notable films produced in Croatia and directed by Croatian directors such as Ante Babaja, Nikola Tanhofer, Zvonimir Berković and Krsto Papić.

She won a Golden Arena for Best Actress in 2012 for a starring role in Night Boats, a romantic drama film directed by Igor Mirković. Karić died on 9 October 2014 in Zagreb, aged 73.

Selected filmography
Accidental Life (Slučajni život, 1969)
The Scene of the Crash (Putovanje na mjesto nesreće, 1971)
The House (Kuća, 1975)
That's the Way the Cookie Crumbles (Živi bili pa vidjeli, 1979)
The Secret of Nikola Tesla (Tajna Nikole Tesle, 1980)
Donator (1989)
Charuga (Čaruga, 1991)
Fragments: Chronicle of a Vanishing (Krhotine - Kronika jednog nestajanja, 1991)
Russian Meat (Rusko meso, 1997)
Pont Neuf (1997)
Infection (Infekcija, 2003)
Night Boats (Noćni brodovi, 2012)

References

External links
 

1941 births
2014 deaths
Academy of Dramatic Art, University of Zagreb alumni
20th-century Croatian actresses
Golden Arena winners
Yugoslav film actresses
People from Perušić
21st-century Croatian actresses
Croatian film actresses
Croatian stage actresses
Croatian television actresses
Burials at Mirogoj Cemetery